Pacha Qullu (Aymara pacha world; time, qullu mountain, Hispanicized spellings Pacha Kkollu, Pacha Kollu, also Pacha Kkollu Quimsa Misa) or Kimsa Misa (Aymara kimsa three, misa offering also spelled Quimsa Misa) is a  mountain in the Andes of Bolivia. It is located in the Oruro Department, Litoral Province, Huachacalla Municipality, west of Huachacalla (Wachaqalla). Pacha Qullu lies northwest of Inka Qhamachu.

The mountain is a volcano. While the date of the last eruption is not known, the degree of erosion suggests an age of about 8.3 million years. Pacha Qullu is a Pliocene age volcano. Its slopes range 11–16°, formed by lava flows and pyroclastic material. Erosion has carved radial gullies into its flanks, at whose ends alluvial fans have formed.

The area is very windy. This climate has led to a xerophytic vegetation, including shrubs and tussock grass.

References 

Mountains of Oruro Department
Four-thousanders of the Andes